Qadamgah Mosque is related to the Safavid dynasty and is located in Nishapur County, Qadamgah.

Sources

Gallery 

Mosques in Iran
Mosque buildings with domes
National works of Iran
Buildings and structures in Razavi Khorasan Province
Razavi Khorasan Province articles missing geocoordinate data